Neelakanta is an Indian film director and screenwriter who works predominantly in Telugu films director. He has received the National Award in the screenwriting for the feature Show. He won two National Film Awards & three Nandi Awards.

Personal life
Neelakanta is a native of Kadapa, Andhra Pradesh. He studied at Loyola Public School and Loyola College in Vijayawada. Since his school days, Neelakanta has had a deep love for film direction and film making which is what drove him to Chennai after his graduation.

Career
Neelakanta always wanted to make films which eloquently depicted the psychological study of characters for the off-beat his passion materialised with Show followed by Missamma. He received two national awards, one for Best Screenplay and the other for the Best Feature Film in Telugu for Show while state Nandi Award in the screenplay department for the latter.

He then made Sada Mee Sevalo, with Shriya Saran and Venu Thottempudi in lead roles, and later made a psychological thriller, Nandanavanam 120km.  Both these films did not do well at the box office. Despite its commercial failure, Nanadanavanam got him huge critical acclaim. These were followed by Mr.Medhavi. with Genelia and Raja in the lead roles. This film, produced by RamaRao Bodduluri, proved to be an above-average grosser. He also wrote dialogues for a Telugu remake of the Hindi hit A Wednesday!, entitled Eeenadu. In 2011, Neelakanta directed Virodhi, featuring Meka Srikanth and Kamalinee Mukherjee. Neelakanta secured the best dialogue writer award in the year 2011 for this film. In 2013 he directed Chammak Challo, which gathered bad reviews for both the director and the film.

In 2018, he directed the Malayalam film Zam Zam starring Manjima Mohan. The film is an official remake of the Hindi film Queen.

Filmography

Awards
National Film Awards
National Film Award for Best Feature Film in Telugu – 2002 – Show
National Film Award for Best Screenplay – 2002 – Show

Nandi Awards
Nandi Award for Best Screenplay Writer – Show (2001)
Nandi Award for Best Screenplay Writer – Missamma (2003)
Nandi Award for Best Dialogue Writer – Virodhi (2011)

References

External links
 

Telugu film directors
Living people
Telugu screenwriters
Nandi Award winners
People from Kadapa district
20th-century Indian film directors
21st-century Indian film directors
Film directors from Andhra Pradesh
Tamil film directors
21st-century Indian dramatists and playwrights
Screenwriters from Andhra Pradesh
Best Original Screenplay National Film Award winners
Year of birth missing (living people)
21st-century Indian screenwriters